Khanjar Khan (also Romanized as Khanjar Khān; also known as Khandzhalkhan and Khānjal Khān) is a village in Qarah Su Rural District, in the Central District of Khoy County, West Azerbaijan Province, Iran. At the 2006 census, its population was 307, in 68 families.

References 

Populated places in Khoy County